is a passenger railway station located in the northeastern part of the city of Odawara, Kanagawa, Japan, operated by Central Japan Railway Company (JR Central).

Lines
Shimo-Soga Station is served by the Gotemba Line and is 3.8 kilometers from the terminus of the line at Kōzu Station.

Station layout
Shimo-Soga station consists of a single ground-level island platform. The station is staffed.

History 
Shimo-Soga Station opened on May 15, 1922. The station building was destroyed by the 1923 Great Kanto earthquake. With the opening of the Tanna Tunnel in 1934, it became a station on the Gotemba line. On August 21, 1962 regular freight services were discontinued, but were resumed again on October 1, 1967. Since the privatization of the Japanese National Railways on April 1, 1987, the station has been for passengers only.

Station numbering was introduced to the Gotemba Line in March 2018; Shimo-Soga Station was assigned station number CB01.

Passenger statistics
In fiscal 2018, the station was used by an average of 1313 passengers daily (boarding passengers only).

The passenger figures (boarding passengers only) for previous years are as shown below.

Surrounding area
Odawara City Hall Shimosoga Branch
Shimosoga Post Office

See also
List of railway stations in Japan

References

External links

 Gotemba Line Users' Association information 

Railway stations in Japan opened in 1922
Odawara